Paradise Belongs to You is the first album released by doom metal band Saturnus.

Track listing
 "Paradise Belongs to You" - 10:16
 "Christ Goodbye" - 8:10
 "As We Dance the Path of Fire or Solace" - 1:41
 "Pilgrimage of Sorrow" - 9:16
 "The Fall of Nakkiel" - 5:05
 "Astral Dawn" - 7:53
 "I Love Thee" - 8:33
 "The Underworld" - 9:26
 "Lament for this Treacherous World" (4-minute silence from 3:20 to 7:20, then 10-second hidden track) - 7:30

References

1996 albums
Saturnus (band) albums